The New Zealand urchin clingfish (Dellichthys morelandi) is a clingfish. It is found around New Zealand wherever sea urchins are present.  Its length is between 2 and 3 cm.

This species was described by John C. Briggs in 1955 and was thought to be the sole species in the monotypic genus Dellichthys until 2018 when a new species, Dellichthys trnskii, was described after being discovered from intertidal and shallow coastal waters of New Zealand in that year. Briggs gave the species its specific name in honour of John Munne Moreland (1921-2012) of the Dominion Museum in Wellington.

References

 
 Tony Ayling & Geoffrey Cox, Collins Guide to the Sea Fishes of New Zealand,  (William Collins Publishers Ltd, Auckland, New Zealand 1982) 

New Zealand urchin clingfish
Endemic marine fish of New Zealand
Taxa named by John Carmon Briggs
Fish described in 1955